Khajuwala is a town in the Bikaner district of Rajasthan, India. It is an Municipality  with several villages under its administration. It produces a lot of raw cotton and wheat. Indira Gandhi Canal has brought about development of this area. It is a big agro products market in Bikaner district. Earlier its name was Beriyawali. It is also seat in Rajasthan legislative assembly. The current elected Member of Legislative assembly (MLA) from Khajuwala is Govind ram meghwal (INC).
Khajuwala has recently been given a status of Municipality.

Khajuwala also has many industries such as mustard oil mills and cotton spinning mills. There are a large number of brick kilns on the outskirts of the town and there are also gypsum mines and plants.

It is the leading wheat, cotton, mustard and guar producing tehsil of Bikaner district. Agriculture is flourishing well here. With canal irrigation you can see vast lush green farmlands.

Marwari *(Bikaneri) is the native language of Khajuwala.

Extent, geography and climate 

Khajuwala is in the Thar Desert. Thorny shrubs and sandy dunes are the basic characteristics of this region. Kikar(Acacia), Aak (Calotropis procera), Khejari (Prosopis cineraria), Khimp (Leptadenia pyrotechnica), Lathiya, Laana and Booiin (Aerva tomentosa), Tumba(Citrullus colocynthis) make natural vegetation of this area. According to experts Khajuwala area is enriched with fertile soil for crops. Gypsum rocks are assets of this region. The waters of Ignp canal has brought changes to flora and fauna and agriculture of wheat, mustard, cotton, Guar, pulses and Jawar has given a composite form of sandy dunes and green fields. This region with Gharsana is called cotton-belt but now things are changing. Average annual rainfall has fallen dramatically in the last few years. Since key source of irrigation is canal-water, water supply is inadequate for agriculture.

Minerals 
Gypsum is the most common mineral found in the rocks of this area. The gypsum deposits occur in rocks of the tertiary period (roughly from the 6.6 crore to 25.8 lakhs years old period), and are considered to have been formed by an evaporation process.

Governance 
Khajuwala is currently a gram panchayat local government. Khajuwala is divided into 23 wards. Khajuwala is a Tehsil and panchayat samiti also.
Khajuwala was given municipality status in previous years, but returned to the status of village panchayat due to the government's indifference. The main census town is known as Beriawali and Panchayat, and also Beriawali.

Economy 
People are mainly dependent on agriculture-based trades.

Industries 
In terms of industry, gypsum grinding factories occupy the most important place. Raw gypsum material is supplied from villages. The government central processing unit is perhaps the largest such unit in the Asian continent. After grinding, gypsum is transported to other northern Indian cities where gypsum-based large-scale industries use it as a raw material.

There are many oil mills, cotton mills, and brick factories. There was a time when the Khajuwala area was known for its high yield of cotton. A number of factories for processing cotton were shut down in recent decades.  Various markets work to fulfil the needs of people of the town and its surrounding villages.
Jaswinder diesel service
All type of tractor diesel pump CRDI router Delphi are repaired at this shop from 30 years in khaajuvala.mob 9413467040

Culture 
The Bagri, Punjabi, Hindi, Sindhi and Marwari languages are spoken here. People practise the Hindu, Sikh and Buddhist religions, as well as Islam. The Dera culture is also present here. Many people follow Radha Swami, Sacha Sauda, and Nirankari Mission Deras.

Transport to other cities and villages 
There are direct buses to Jaipur, Jodhpur, Sri Ganganagar, and Bikaner. There are Rajasthan State Road Transport Corporation (RSRTC) roadways buses also available for different routes. Railway services are not present here. The central government's Bharatmala highway will go from here.

Government buildings and facilities 
The government runs the local schools, a community health care centre, veterinary hospital, excise department office and the Office of Forest Department. A police station and BSF campus are in the town. Branches of the State Bank of India (SBI), Punjab National Bank (PNB),  ICICI Bank , Bank of Baroda (BOB), Rajasthan Marudhara Gramin Bank (RMGB) and the Central Co-operative Bank also operate here. ATM facilities are available at the SBI, BOB, ICICI and PNB banks. A sub-post office branch is also available here.

Education

Colleges 
 Jagdamba pg college  :this is first and largest college in terms of number of students.
 Govt. college khajuwala 
 Govt. ITI college 
 S.K.S chandi college.
 Shiva girls college.
 S.D college.
 Raj degree college.
 Shekhawati Group of education coaching and school.

Schools 
There are many schools in the town.

References 

Government College, Khajuwala

Villages in Bikaner district